Greggs is a British bakery chain.

Greggs may also refer to:
Gregg's (New Zealand), coffee, desserts and condiments company
Alex Greggs, Canadian songwriter, record producer, and remixer
Kima Greggs, fictional character on The Wire
Tom Greggs,  British theologian